The 2012 St. Paul Cash Spiel was held from October 12 to 14 at the St. Paul Curling Club in St. Paul, Minnesota as part of the 2012–13 World Curling Tour. The event was held in a round robin format, and the purses for the men's and women's events were USD$16,000 and USD$7,200, respectively. In the men's final, John Shuster defeated Todd Birr with a score of 6–4 to win his second World Curling Tour title as skip, while Patti Lank defeated Margie Smith in the women's final with a score of 7–2 to claim her second consecutive title at the St. Paul Cash Spiel.

Men

Teams
The teams are listed as follows:

Round-robin standings
Final round-robin standings

Playoffs

Women

Teams

The teams are listed as follows:

Round-robin standings
Final round-robin standings

Tiebreaker

Playoffs

References

External links

2012 in curling
Curling in Minnesota